Bouarfa may refer to:

Bouarfa, Algeria
Bouarfa, Morocco
 Bouarfa Airport